The 1966–67 Indiana Hoosiers men's basketball team represented Indiana University as members of the Big Ten Conference. Their head coach was Lou Watson, who was in his second year. The team played its home games in New Fieldhouse in Bloomington, Indiana. The Hoosiers finished the season 18–8, 10–4 in Big Ten play to finish in a tie for first. Indiana was invited to play in the NCAA Tournament.

Roster

Schedule/Results

|-
!colspan=8| Regular Season
|-

|-
!colspan=8| NCAA Tournament

References

Indiana Hoosiers
Indiana Hoosiers men's basketball seasons
Indiana Hoosiers
Indiana Hoosiers